L'Astragale is a French film directed by Guy Casaril and released in 1968, inspired by the novel of the same name written by Albertine Sarrazin.

Plot
Nineteen-year-old Anne escapes from prison to join a recently released friend. While jumping the prison wall, she injures her foot and fractures her talus bone. Julien, a mobster, takes her in, looks after her, and makes her discover passionate love. Anne falls very much in love but Julien neglects her. When the latter is arrested, Anne engages in prostitution and theft, putting money aside to live a happy day with him.

Cast 

 Marlène Jobert as Anne

 Horst Buchholz as Julien

 Magali Noël as Annie la Cravate

 Claude Génia as The Mother

 Georges Géret as Jean

 Jean-Pierre Moulin as Eddie

 Gisèle Hauchecorne as Nini

 Claude Marcault as Rolande

 Raoul Delfosse as Pierre
 Jürgen Draeger as Pedro
 Brigitte Grothum as Ginette

References 

Films directed by Guy Casaril
French films based on novels
1960s French films